Calm or CALM may refer to:

Acronyms

Organisations
 Cal-Maine (NASDAQ: CALM), an American egg producer
 Campaign Against Living Miserably, a UK charity
 Department of Conservation and Land Management (Western Australia)
California Living Museum, a zoo in Bakersfield, California

Science and medicine
Calmodulin (CaM), calcium-modulated protein
CALM2
CALM3
Clathrin-assembly lymphoid myeloid leukaemia protein, see Ap180
Communications, Air-interface, Long and Medium range, a standardized set of protocols and parameters for high speed communication
CALM M5

Legislation
Commercial Advertisement Loudness Mitigation Act, U.S. legislation prohibiting TV commercials from being louder than the program on which they are shown
Conservation and Land Management Act 1984, or CALM Act, Western Australian legislation that created the Department of Conservation and Land Management

Art and entertainment
"The Calm" (Arrow), an episode of Arrow
The Calm (film), a 1980 film
Calm, a fictional city in the Kiba (tv series) anime world

Music
Calm (music group), an American hip hop group
Calm (album), a 2020 album by 5 Seconds of Summer
The Calm (Insane Clown Posse EP)
The Calm (Kaskade album)
 The Calm (Hostyle Gospel album)
"The Calm (Interlude)", a song by Tinashe from Aquarius (Tinashe album)
A piece of music by Vektroid from the album Neo Cali

People
Jonathan Calm (born 1971), American visual artist
Marie Calm (1832–1887), German author and feminist

Other uses 
Calm (company), a software company in San Francisco, California
Calm, Missouri, a community in the United States
Intertropical Convergence Zone, also known as The Calms

See also
Calmness